The 1998 Sydney water crisis involved the suspected contamination of the water supply system of Greater Metropolitan Sydney by the microscopic pathogens Cryptosporidium and Giardia between July and September 1998.

Following routine water sampling and testing, over a series of weeks low level contaminants were found at Prospect, Sydney Hospital, the NSW Art Gallery, Macquarie Street, Centennial Park,  and water treatment facilities at Warragamba, Nepean, Woronora, Macarthur, the Illawarra and Prospect. The reliability of these test results was subsequently called into doubt. Precautionary "boil water" alerts were raised covering several suburban areas for the period of the crisis.

In response to the crisis, the Government of New South Wales established a Commission of Inquiry, chaired by jurist Peter McClellan  as Commissioner. McClennan handed down his final report to the NSW Premier making ninety-one recommendations that led to the reorganisation of water supply and water management functions and agencies in Greater Metropolitan Sydney via the establishment of the Sydney Catchment Authority with responsibility for catchments, dams, and bulk supply reservoirs; while Sydney Water maintained management of water supply distribution, water treatment and sewerage, and stormwater management. Both the Chairman and Managing Director of Sydney Water stood down during and following the crisis.

Background

Sydney's water supply network
The water supply was drawn from catchments on four main river systems the Upper Nepean, the Warragamba, the Shoalhaven and the Woronora with minor supplies drawn from the Hawkesbury River, and tributaries of the Grose, Fish and Duckmaloi rivers.

Since late 1996 all of Sydney's water supply has been filtered. Eleven water treatment plants are used to filter drinking water supplied to Sydney, Illawarra and the Blue Mountains. Seven of these facilities are owned and operated by Sydney Water. These are located at Orchard Hills, Cascade, North Richmond, Nepean, Warragamba,  and Greaves Creek. The remaining four privately owned and operated plants at Prospect, Macarthur, Illawarra and Woronora provide filtered water under contract to Sydney Water. These four plants provide more than 90% of Sydney's drinking water. Up to 80% is supplied through the Prospect plant alone. The water is distributed from Prospect to Pipe Head by tunnels and mains, with some areas supplied directly from these mains. Two pumping stations one at Prospect and one at  supply water for the northern suburbs and the northern beaches. The water for Ryde is supplied from Pipe Head.

Timeline of event
Low levels of Cryptosporidium and Giardia were first detected in the water supply on 21 July. The levels were within acceptable health limits. In days following, much higher levels were recorded, and on 27 July, the first "boil water" alert (in which residents were instructed to boil their tap water before use) was declared for the eastern Sydney central business district. On 29 July, a "boil water" alert was issued for the south of Sydney Harbour and on 30 July a Sydney-wide "boil water" alert was issued.

The Sydney Water Corporation announced the water safe to drink again on 4 August.

The contamination was caused by low-quality raw water entering the dam. This was attributed to moderate rainfall in July, followed by heavy rainfall in August and September (after decreasing storage levels since mid-July 1997) which caused pulses of the raw water to enter the dam.

The incident was highly publicised and caused major public alarm. Three successive "boil water" notices in which residents were instructed to boil their tap water before use affected up to three million residents.

The lack of cases of cryptosporidiosis, giardiasis, or any other health problem which might be attributed to tainted water led to suggestions the microbes were either not an infectious type, or not as prevalent as measured. An inquiry after the event revealed the publicity as an exaggeration of fact, with Australian Water Technologies, part of Sydney Water, severely overestimating the levels of parasites present in the water, with the recorded levels exposed as not harmful to human health. The handling of the crisis by Sydney Water, a state-government owned corporation since 1995, was heavily criticised, causing the resignation of both the chairman and the managing director. The incident also brought up issues of private vs. public ownership and scientific uncertainty.

Outcomes
The Premier, Bob Carr, established the Sydney Water Inquiry and appointed Sydney jurist Peter McClellan  as Commissioner. McClellan delivered a series of interim reports to the Premier, which were tabled in Parliament. The final report was delivered in December 1998 and detailed 91 recommendations for action by Sydney Water, NSW Health and other state and federal government agencies, including the National Health and Medical Research Commission.

The Chairman of Sydney Water, David Hill resigned ten days after the final crisis event, denied any responsibility, and claimed he was leaving only to concentrate on his political career.

The Sydney Catchment Authority was created in 1999 as result of the crisis, assuming control of Sydney's catchments and dams, while Sydney Water maintained responsibility for water treatment and distribution and for sewage collection, treatment and disposal.

References

Cited

General
 Hrudey, Elizabeth J. (2004). Safe Drinking Water: Lessons from Recent Outbreaks in Affluent Nations. IWA Publishing, 351–356.

Further reading
 
 
 
 
 

1998 health disasters
1998 in Australia
1990s in Sydney
Environmental issues with water
Health disasters in Australia
Water supply and sanitation in Australia
Sydney Water